Anthony Carson may refer to:

 Anthony J. Carson (1869–1943), United States Army corporal and Medal of Honor recipient
 Anthony Carson (writer) (1907–1973), British journalist and travel writer